Copelatus bacchusi is a species of diving beetle. It is part of the genus Copelatus in the subfamily Copelatinae of the family Dytiscidae. It was described by Wewalka in 1981.

References

bacchusi
Beetles described in 1981